The 2002 NFL season was the 83rd regular season of the National Football League (NFL).

The league went back to an even number of teams with the addition of the Houston Texans; the league has remained static with 32 teams since. The clubs were realigned into eight divisions, four teams in each. Also, the Chicago Bears played their home games in 2002 in Champaign, Illinois at Memorial Stadium because of the reconstruction of Soldier Field.

The NFL title was won by the Tampa Bay Buccaneers when they defeated the Oakland Raiders in Super Bowl XXXVII, at Qualcomm Stadium in San Diego, California on January 26, 2003. It would be the last Super Bowl  held in January and the last to be hosted in San Diego.

Expansion and realignment
With the Houston Texans joining the NFL, the teams were realigned into eight divisions: four teams in each division and four divisions in each conference. The league tried to maintain historical rivalries from the old alignment while organizing the teams geographically. Legally, three teams from the AFC Central (Cincinnati, Cleveland, and Pittsburgh) were required to be in the same division as part of any realignment proposals; this was part of the NFL's settlement with the city of Cleveland in the wake of the 1995 Cleveland Browns relocation controversy.

The major changes were:
 The Indianapolis Colts from the AFC East, Jacksonville Jaguars and Tennessee Titans from the AFC Central, and expansion Houston Texans were placed into the newly formed AFC South. The owners of the Jaguars, Titans and Texans tried to convince the owner of the Miami Dolphins to take the 4th spot in the AFC South instead of the Colts but Dolphins owner ultimately decided to remain with their longtime rivals in the new AFC East. 
 The Atlanta Falcons, Carolina Panthers, and New Orleans Saints from the NFC West and Tampa Bay Buccaneers from the NFC Central were placed into the newly formed NFC South.
 The teams in the AFC Central and NFC Central were placed in the new AFC North and NFC North respectively, apart from the Titans, Jaguars and Buccaneers.
 The Seattle Seahawks became the only team to switch conferences, moving from the AFC West to the NFC West.
 The Arizona Cardinals moved from the NFC East to the NFC West. Owner Bill Bidwill was publicly disappointed by the decision but said he would accept it.

Additionally, the arrival of the Texans meant that the league could return to its pre-1999 scheduling format in which no team received a bye during the first three weeks or last seven weeks of the season. From 1999 to 2001, at least one team sat out each week (including the preseason) because of an odd number of teams in the league (this also happened in 1960, 1966, and other years wherein the league had an odd number of teams). It nearly became problematic during the previous season due to the September 11 attacks, since the San Diego Chargers had their bye week during that week and the league considered cancelling that week's slate of games before ultimately rescheduling them after Week 17.

The league also introduced a new eight-year scheduling rotation designed so that all teams will play each other at least twice during those eight years, and play in every other team's stadium at least once. Under scheduling formulas in use from 1978 to 2001, there were several instances of  two teams in different divisions going over 15 seasons without playing each other. Under the new scheduling formula, only two of a team's games each season are based on the previous season's record, down from four under the previous system. All teams play four interconference games. An analysis of win percentages in 2008 showed a statistical trend upwards for top teams since this change; the top team each year then averaged 14.2 wins, versus 13.4 previously.

The playoff format was also modified from the one first used in : the number of playoff teams remained the same at 12, but four division winners and two wild cards from each conference advanced to the playoffs, instead of three division winners and three wild cards. In each conference, the division winners were now seeded 1 through 4, and the wild cards were seeded 5 and 6. The only way a wild card team could host a playoff game was if both teams in the conference's championship game were wild cards. This 2002 revised format lasted until . In , the number of playoff teams expanded to 14, and the number of wild card teams went back to three.

Player movement

Draft
The 2002 NFL Draft was held from April 20 to 21, 2002 at New York City's Theater at Madison Square Garden. With the first pick, the Houston Texans selected quarterback David Carr from Fresno State University.

Expansion Draft
The 2002 NFL expansion draft was held on February 18, 2002. 155 players were left unprotected by their teams for the Houston Texans to select to fill their initial roster. With the first overall pick, the Texans selected offensive tackle Tony Boselli from the Jacksonville Jaguars.

Major rule changes

A player who touches a pylon remains in-bounds until any part of his body touches the ground out-of-bounds.
Continuing-action fouls now become dead-ball fouls and will result in the loss of down and distance.
Any dead-ball penalties by the offense after they have made the line to gain will result in a loss of 15 yards and a new first down. Previously, the 15 yard penalty was enforced but the down was replayed.

The act of batting and stripping the ball from a player is officially legal.
Chop-blocks are illegal on kicking plays.
Hitting a quarterback helmet-to-helmet anytime after a change of possession is illegal.
After a kickoff, the game clock will start when the ball is touched legally in the field of play. Previously, the clock started immediately when the ball was kicked.
Inside the final two minutes of a half/overtime, the game clock will not stop when the player who originally takes the snap is tackled behind the line of scrimmage (i.e. sacked).

Also, with the opening of the NFL's first stadium with a retractable roof, Reliant Stadium, the following rules were enacted:
The home team must determine whether their retractable roof is to be opened or closed 90 minutes before kickoff (regular season only; in the playoffs, the NFL determines whether the roof is open or closed).
If it is closed at kickoff, it cannot be reopened during the game.
If it is open at kickoff, it cannot be closed during the game unless the weather conditions become severe.

2002 Deaths
 Johnny Unitas who died on September 11, 2002 from a heart attack. On Week 2 of the season each game played held a moment of silence pre-game tribute to Unitas.
 Dick "Night Train" Lane
 Mike Webster
 Al Lerner owner of the Cleveland Browns passed away during the 2002 season the Browns wore a patch on their uniforms to commemorate Lerner.

Final regular season standings

Tiebreakers
 N.Y. Jets finished ahead of New England in the AFC East based on a better record in common games (8–4 to 7–5) and Miami based on better division record (4–2 to 2–4).
 New England finished ahead of Miami in the AFC East based on better division record (4–2 to 2–4).
 Cleveland clinched the AFC 6 seed instead of Denver or New England based on better conference record (7–5 to Denver's 5–7 and New England's 6–6).
 Oakland clinched the AFC 1 seed instead of Tennessee based on a head-to-head victory.
 San Diego finished ahead of Kansas City in the AFC West based on better division record (3–3 to 2–4).
 Philadelphia clinched the NFC 1 seed instead of Green Bay or Tampa Bay based on better conference record (11–1 to Green Bay's 9–3 and Tampa Bay's 9–3).
 Tampa Bay clinched the NFC 2 seed instead of Green Bay on a head-to-head victory.
 St. Louis finished ahead of Seattle in the NFC West based on better division record (4–2 to 2–4).

Playoffs

Bracket

Milestones
The following teams and players set all-time NFL records during the season:

Statistical leaders

Team

Individual

Awards

Coaching changes
Carolina Panthers – John Fox; replaced George Seifert, who was fired following the 2001-02 season
Houston Texans – Dom Capers became first head coach in Texans history.
Indianapolis Colts – Tony Dungy; replaced Jim Mora, who was fired following the 2001-02 season
Oakland Raiders – Bill Callahan; replaced Jon Gruden, who was traded to Tampa for two 1st round draft picks, two 2nd round draft picks and cash.
San Diego Chargers – Marty Schottenheimer; replaced Mike Riley, who was fired following the 2001-02 season
Tampa Bay Buccaneers – Jon Gruden; replaced Tony Dungy, who was fired following the 2001-02 season
Washington Redskins – Steve Spurrier; replaced Marty Schottenheimer, who was fired following the 2001-02 season

Stadium changes
 Baltimore Ravens: PSINet Stadium reverted to Ravens Stadium after naming rights holder PSINet filed for bankruptcy
 Chicago Bears: The Bears temporarily played at Memorial Stadium in Champaign, Illinois while Soldier Field underwent a major renovation
 Dallas Cowboys: Texas Stadium’s AstroTurf was replaced with new RealGrass turf surface by week 5 of the season.
 Detroit Lions: The Lions moved from the Silverdome in Pontiac, Michigan to Ford Field in Downtown Detroit, with the Ford Motor Company acquiring the naming rights
 Houston Texans: The expansion Texans begin playing at Reliant Stadium, the league's first stadium with a retractable roof, with Reliant Energy acquiring the naming rights
 New England Patriots: The Patriots moved from Foxboro Stadium to CMGI Field (known better as Gillette Stadium), with the tech company CMGI acquiring the naming rights
 St. Louis Rams: The former Trans World Dome was renamed the Edward Jones Dome after Edward Jones Investments acquired the naming rights
 Seattle Seahawks: The Seahawks moved from Husky Stadium to Seahawks Stadium
 Tennessee Titans: Adelphia Coliseum reverted to The Coliseum after naming rights holder Adelphia Communications Corporation filed for bankruptcy

New uniforms

Reebok becomes official provider

Reebok took over the contract to be the official athletic supplier to the NFL for all 32 teams’ uniforms. Previously, all teams had individual contracts with athletic suppliers. American Needle, which had a contract with a few teams before the Reebok deal, challenged the NFL in court over Reebok's exclusive deal, with the NFL effectively stating that it was a “single-entity league” instead of a group consisting of various owners. The case eventually went all the way to the Supreme Court of the United States. In 2009, the Supreme Court agreed to hear American Needle, Inc. v. National Football League. In 2010, the court ruled that the NFL is not a single entity. Reebok remained the league's athletic supplier through the 2011 NFL season, when Nike took over the contract for the 2012 NFL season.

Reebok had initially announced when the deal was signed in 2000 that aside from the expansion Texans, all NFL teams would be wearing new uniforms for the 2002 season. However, after protests from several owners—most vocally Pittsburgh Steelers owner Dan Rooney—Reebok later rescinded the proposal. Reebok did, however (by player request to reduce holding calls), shorten the sleeves on the jerseys for teams that hadn't done so already (most players had been for the previous decade tying the sleeves tight around their arms to prevent holding) and made the jerseys tighter-fitting. This is perhaps most noticeable on the Indianapolis Colts jerseys, where the shoulder stripes, which initially went from the top of the shoulders all the way underneath the arms, were truncated to just the top portion of the shoulders.

Uniform changes
Although Reebok rescinded the idea of all NFL teams wearing new uniforms for the 2002 season, the Buffalo Bills and Seattle Seahawks did redesign their uniforms, with the Seahawks also unveiling an updated logo in honor of their move to Seahawks Stadium and the NFC.

 The Arizona Cardinals wore white pants with white jerseys for two games, and red pants with red jerseys for one game. It was the first time they wore all-white since 1989, and first time they ever wore all-red. 
 The Buffalo Bills introduced new uniforms featuring, among others, a darker shade of blue, nickel gray as an accent color, and red side panels on both the home and away jerseys
 The Carolina Panthers added blue third alternate uniforms
 The Cleveland Browns added orange third alternate uniforms
 The Denver Broncos added orange third alternate uniforms
 The Houston Texans expansion team introduced dark blue helmets; dark blue and white jerseys, both with red trim; and white pants to be worn with the blue jerseys and blue pants with the white jerseys. The new helmet logo features a bull head colored and shaped in such a way to resemble the flag of Texas and the state of Texas.
 The Jacksonville Jaguars added black third alternate uniforms, and introduced new black pants with home uniforms for selected games.
 The New Orleans Saints returned to wearing gold pants with their black jerseys, and with their white jerseys for selected games. They introduced a gold alternate jersey but only wore it for one game (week 15 vs. Minnesota). 
 The New York Jets began wearing green pants with either their green or white jerseys 
 The San Diego Chargers switched back to navy pants with white jerseys, also brought back throwback powder blue uniforms for one game.
 The Seattle Seahawks introduced new uniforms featuring, among others, a lighter "Seahawks Blue", a darker "Seahawks Navy" and lime green piping. The helmet was changed from silver to the darker navy color. The helmet logo was also modified, re-colored accordingly to the new team colors, and the eyebrows and eyes redrawn to make it a more aggressive bird. 
 The St. Louis Rams removed the side panels from their jerseys.
 The Washington Redskins introduced replicas of their 1960s design as a third alternate uniform.

Television
This was the fifth year under the league's eight-year broadcast contracts with ABC, CBS, Fox, and ESPN to televise Monday Night Football, the AFC package, the NFC package, and Sunday Night Football, respectively.

This was the first season since 1980 without a Pat Summerall–John Madden lead broadcast team. Although Summerall had previously announced his retirement as a full-time NFL broadcaster after the 2001 season ended, he continued to call selected games for Fox in 2002. Meanwhile, ABC hired Madden from Fox to join Al Michaels in a two-man booth, dropping the network's experiment with Micheals, Dan Fouts, and comedian Dennis Miller on MNF.

Joe Buck, Troy Aikman, and Cris Collinsworth replaced Summerall and Madden as Fox's new lead broadcast team. The network opted to leave Dick Stockton and Daryl Johnston as Fox's #2 team in a two-man booth, and not find a replacement for Aikman there. To replace Collinsworth on Fox NFL Sunday, the network initially used a rotating series of guest analysts before Jimmy Johnson took over the seat permanently midway through the season.

Boomer Esiason and Dan Marino joined The NFL Today as analysts, while Randy Cross went back to color commentating for CBS, Mike Ditka left the program, and Jerry Glanville was a reserve color commentator from 2002-2003.

Notes

External links
Football Outsiders 2002 Team Efficiency Ratings
2002 OFFENSIVE EFFICIENCY RATINGS
2002 DEFENSIVE EFFICIENCY RATINGS
Pro Football Reference.com – 2002

References

 NFL Record and Fact Book
 NFL History 2001– (Last accessed October 17, 2005)
 Total Football: The Official Encyclopedia of the National Football League
 NFL adopts changes to rules (Last accessed October 17, 2005)
 New alignment takes effect in 2002 from ESPN.com, May 22, 2001 (Last accessed March 11, 2009)
 NFL Announces 2002–2009 Schedule Rotation (Last accessed January 19, 2008)
 Seattle moved to NFC in approved realignment plan from CNNSI.com, May 22, 2001 (Last accessed December 9, 2005)

National Football League seasons
 
National Football League